Simon Greul and Alessandro Motti won in the final 6–4, 7–5, against Daniele Bracciali and Filippo Volandri. They became the first champions of this tournament.

Seeds

Draw

Draw

References
 Doubles Draw

Rai Open - Doubles
2009 Doubles